Kargilik or Karghalik or Yecheng in Chinese, is a town in Xinjiang, China. It is to the southeast of Kashgar, at a distance of 249 km by road and is north of Mazar by 249 km. It is the seat of Kargilik (Yecheng) County.

Kargilik/Yecheng is the name of both the oasis and the town. It is situated on the southern rim of the Taklamakan desert, about halfway between Pishan and Yarkand on the southern route around the Tarim Basin. It is about 50 km north of Kokyar. The rich loess terraces of the oasis are watered by the Tiznaf river and several smaller streams. They are joined to the north by a belt of cultivated land stretching about 40 km from the town of Yecheng to the Yarkand River.

History
During the Former Han period, this place was referred to as Xiye. It was described as having 350 households, 4,000 people and 1,000 men able to bear arms. It was ruled  by a king of a neighboring area called Zihe. In the Later Han period it was also known as Piaosha which translates literally as "drifting sands". It was noted for producing baicao (白草, literally "white grass") which gave a very poisonous substance used on arrow tips - probably from an aconite plant. Xiye is recorded in the Book of the Later Han as being distinct from Zihe and having 2,500 households, more than 10,000 people and 3,000 men able to bear arms.

The Chinese pilgrim monk, Song Yun, passed through the Kingdom of Zhujuban on his way from Khotan in 519 CE. He described it as being five days' journey around and that it produced much cereal, which was made into cakes. The inhabitants did not allow the slaughter of animals and only ate those which had died a natural death. Many of them lived in the mountains. They resembled the people of Khotan in their language and customs while their writing was like that of the Brahmans from India.

During the 1800s, Kargalik contained many foreign slaves who had integrated into the Chinese state. After being freed, many slaves such as Gilgitis in Xinjiang cities like Tashkurgan, Yarkand and Karghallik, stayed rather than return Hunza in Gilgit. Most of these slaves were women who married local slaves and free men and had children with them. Sometimes the women were married to their masters, other slaves or free men who were not their masters. There were ten slave men to slave women married couples and 15 master-female slave couples, with several other non-master free men married to slave women. Both slaves and free Turki and Chinese men fathered children with Hunza slave women. A free man, Khas Muhammad, was married with two children to a female slave named Daulat, aged 24. A Gilgiti slave woman aged 26, Makhmal, was married to a Chinese slave man, Allah Vardi and had three children with him.

In 1994, the Chinese character name for the town was set as Kageleke (喀格勒克镇).

On 28 February 2012, ethnic Uyghurs, wielding knives, attacked a market in Yecheng, killing 13 people, mostly ethnic Han. The police shot & killed the seven Uyghur attackers.

Geography
Kargilik Town is located on the alluvial fan of the Tizinafu River located in the northern part of Kargilik County. Chasa Meschit Township (Qiasameiqite, Qiasimiqiti) surrounds Kargilik Town on the north, east and south. To the west, the town borders Yitimliqum Township (Yitimukong).

Administrative Divisions
As of 2019, Kargilik Town included fifty-two residential communities: (Mandarin Chinese pinyin-derived names)
Agezikangboyi, Boxirekekuoqia, Bage'airekeboyi, Anjiangmaili, Qipandai'erwazha, Xicheng, Bagemaili, Lanqiao, Linggongli, Xincheng, Xingfunanlu, Yawage, Hongqiao, Xinshiji, Jiefangbeilu, Xingfuyuan, Langan, Dongfanghong, Huochezhan, Yucailu, Youligunjiayi, Tugeman'airekeboyi, Kasike'aireke, Yabixi, Tuguqikuoqia, Gongyuan, Wusitangboyi, Hongqi, Tianyuan, Jinguo, Tuanjie, Anakuoqia, Qiman, Gongluhuayuan, Chahua, Qipandonglu, Wuhaozha, Yuecheng, Kunlun, Qingnianlu, Youyilu, Shuangyonglu, Alilu, Aimin, Yusaisi, Donghuanlu, Xueyu, Yuanlin, Nanhuanlu, Huimin, Changhe, Jingguan

As of 2009:
Agezikangboyi 阿格孜康博依社区 Boxirekekuoqia 伯西热克阔恰社区 Bage'airikeboyi 巴格艾日克博依社区 Anjiangmaili 安江买里社区 Qipandai'erwazha 棋盘代尔瓦扎社区 Bageqia 巴格恰社区 Bagemaili 巴格买里社区 Lanqiao 蓝桥社区 Linggongli 零公里社区

Economy 

In earlier times it was important as the usual starting-point for caravans to India, through the Pamirs, via Tashkurghan, or through Ladakh by the Karakoram passes. 

Today there is a small town with a market, some shops and a bank. Large-scale irrigation has transformed huge areas of desert into productive agricultural land. Yecheng is the main centre for Chinese immigration into western Xinjiang and it has become quite a large, sprawling town.

The total economic output of the town for that year of 2011 was valued at 309,812,200 CNY.

Demographics 

, 78.7% of the residents of the town were Uyghur.

Transportation 
Yecheng is served by China National Highways 219, 315 and the Kashgar-Hotan Railway.

References

Sources 
 Dorje, Gyurme (2009). Tibet Handbook. 4th Edition. Footprint, Bath, England. .
 Hill, John E. 2004. The Peoples of the West from the Weilue 魏略 by Yu Huan 魚豢: A Third Century Chinese Account Composed between 239 and 265 CE. Draft annotated English translation. 
 Hill, John E. (2009) Through the Jade Gate to Rome: A Study of the Silk Routes during the Later Han Dynasty, 1st to 2nd Centuries CE. BookSurge, Charleston, South Carolina. . 
 Hulsewé, A. F. P. and Loewe, M. A. N. 1979. China in Central Asia: The Early Stage 125 BC – AD 23: an annotated translation of chapters 61 and 96 of the History of the Former Han Dynasty. E. J. Brill, Leiden.
 Mallory, J. P. and Mair, Victor H. 2000. The Tarim Mummies: Ancient China and the Mystery of the Earliest Peoples from the West. Thames & Hudson. London. 2000. 
 Stein, Aurel M. 1907. Ancient Khotan: Detailed report of archaeological explorations in Chinese Turkestan, 2 vols. Clarendon Press. Oxford.  
 Watters, Thomas 1904-1905. On Yuan Chwang’s Travels in India. London. Royal Asiatic Society. Reprint: Delhi. Mushiram Manoharlal. 1973.

External links 
 Satellite image of region which can be enlarged
Map of Kargilik region

Oases of China
Populated places along the Silk Road
Populated places in Xinjiang
Township-level divisions of Xinjiang
County seats in Xinjiang